The Men's fours event at the 2010 South American Games was held on March 27 at 11:30.

Medalists

Results

References
Report

Fours